Janney couplers are a  semi-automatic form of railway coupling that allow rail cars and locomotives to be securely linked together without rail workers having to get between the vehicles. They are also known as American, AAR, APT, ARA, MCB, knuckle, Buckeye, tightlock (in the UK), Henricot (in Belgium) or Centre Buffer Couplers.

Background

Janney couplers were first patented in 1873 by Eli H. Janney. Andrew Jackson Beard was amongst various inventors that made a multitude of improvements to the knuckle coupler; Beard's patents were  granted 23 November 1897, which then sold for approximately $50,000, and  granted 16 May 1899.

In the UK, several versions of Janney couplers are fitted to a limited number of coaches, multiple units, wagons and locomotives.

Janney Type E, Type F Interlock, and Type H tightlock couplings are compatible subtypes, each intended for specific rail car types.

Prior to the formation of the Association of American Railroads (AAR) these were known as Master Car Builder (MCB) couplers. In 1934 the MCB was renamed as the AAR.

Knuckle couplers of the 1880s and 1890s had a chaotic mixture of proprietary internal components, but all had the standard MCB external contour, making them compatible. There was a multitude of makes and models — Burns, Climax, Gould, Miller, Sharon and Tower. Some worked better than others.

In 1913, American Steel Foundries (ASF) developed the Janney "Type D" coupler, that was then made the MCB standard coupler for North America; new and rebuilt rolling stock had to be fitted with this coupler. This standard ended the market for knuckle couplers with proprietary components, excepting those exported from the US to other countries not complying with MCB standards.

The Alliance coupler, named after the ASF-owned foundry in Alliance, Ohio, was developed as a lighter build than the "Type D", and was marketed by the Amsted Corporation, parent of ASF, as the "Standard for the World". It is still the most-used knuckle coupler in the world. The modern Alliance coupler still uses the modern AAR-10 or 10A contour, but has a shorter thus weaker head length, and thus cannot be used on North American interchanged rolling stock.

Manufacturers of modern "Type E", "Type F Interlock" and "Type H Tightlock" couplers include McConway & Torley, ASF, and Buckeye, also known as Columbus Castings.

The external contour of Janney knuckle couplers was the first aspect to be standardized by the MCB in the 1880s. Prior to this, there was a chaotic variety of constantly evolving and proprietary external contours and internal components. In 1893, manufacturers standardized on the MCB-5 or Type C contour, then in 1915 on the improved MCB-10 or Type D contour, and again in 1932 on the AAR-10A or Type E contour.  The 1893, 1915, and 1932 contours are measurably different with slight dimensional changes that improved performance, yet remain compatible. Janney couplers still use the 1932 contour, though tolerances, metallurgy and machining techniques have improved, resulting in notable reductions in coupler slack. Type H tightlock couplings used on passenger stock have a variation of the 10A contour that nearly eliminates slack during normal operation and minimizes the possibility of "telescoping" during a derailment.

Purpose
The purpose of couplers is to join rail cars and locomotives to each other so they all are securely linked together. Major Eli Janney, a Confederate veteran of the American Civil War, invented the semi-automatic knuckle coupler in 1868. It automatically locks the couplers on cars or locomotives together without a rail worker having to get between the cars, and replaced the link and pin coupler, which was a major cause of railroad worker injuries and deaths. The locking pin that ensures Janney couplers remain fastened together is withdrawn manually by a worker using the "cut lever", which is operated from either side of the railroad car and does not require the person to go between the cars. The only time the worker has to go between cars is after they have been securely coupled, to hook up the air lines for the pneumatic brakes, and the head-end power cables in the case of passenger cars.

Modern Janney couplers typically mount to rail cars and locomotives via draw gear; early Janney couplers often had transitional shanks which mounted into legacy link and pin coupler pockets, or bolted directly to steam locomotive headstocks.

Janney/MCB/ARA/AAR/APTA coupler

The Janney coupler is used in the Americas, Australasia, Africa, Asia, UK, Belgium and Spain (narrow gauge railway only).

Among its features:
 Maximum tonnage as high as  such as on the Fortescue Railway.
 Minimum ultimate tensile strength:
 Grade E knuckles: 
 Grade C or Grade E knuckles are required  for interchange service.
 Grade E coupler bodies: 
 Several Janney coupler types exist to accommodate various cars, but all are required to have certain common dimensions allowing for compatibility.
 Lighter weight railways, notably narrow-gauge lines with no need for interchange, sometimes use smaller (three-quarter- or half-size) versions of the Janney MCB coupler. Such as Victorian narrow gauge lines.
 Janney couplers are always right-handed, i.e., their shape resembles the human right hand with fingers curled, as viewed from above.
 Required coupler heights, in North America
 Empty cars:  ± 
 Loaded cars:  ± 
 Modern AAR standards require Janney couplers to be bottom-operated on cars and top-operated on locomotives. Operation or uncoupling is accomplished by lifting the release pin with a lever extending to the corner of the car; this pin is locked when the coupler is under tension, so the usual uncoupling steps are to compress the coupling with a locomotive, lift and hold up the pin, then pull the cars apart.  "Buckeye"  and "SASKop" couplers are side operated variants of Janney couplers.
 Trains fitted with Janney couplers can accommodate heavier loads than any other type of coupler.
 In New Zealand, heavy coal trains were first fitted with Janney couplers in 1972; a full transition began in 2013 to replace remaining Norwegian couplers with Janney couplers on freight stock and Scharfenberg couplers on passenger stock.

Janney Type E 

Janney Type E double-shelf couplers are yet another variety, typical on North American hazardous material tank cars.

Gooseneck coupler 
With gooseneck couplers or offset shank couplers, the horizontal centerline of the coupler head is above the horizontal centerline of the coupler shank, or shaft, and the draw gear. This arrangement is designed for use with low-floor freight cars, to lift the coupler head high enough to match the couplers on other rolling stock. The large bogie boxvans for car parts, used on the Victorian Railways, were fitted with gooseneck couplers for that reason.

Henricot coupler
The Henricot coupler is a variation on the Janney coupler, introduced by Belgian engineer and entrepreneur  of Court-Saint-Étienne. It is used on certain EMUs of the Belgian State Railways, including the NMBS/SNCB class 75.

History
Janney was a dry goods clerk and former Confederate Army officer from Alexandria, Virginia, who used his lunch hours to whittle from wood an alternative to the link and pin coupler. The term Buckeye comes from the nickname of the US state of Ohio, the "Buckeye state" and the Ohio Brass Company which originally marketed the coupling.

In 1893, satisfied that an automatic coupler could meet the demands of commercial railroad operations and, at the same time, be manipulated safely, the US Congress passed the Safety Appliance Act. Its success in promoting switch-yard safety was stunning. Between 1877 and 1887, approximately 38% of all railworker accidents involved coupling. That percentage fell as the railroads began to replace link and pin couplers with automatic couplers. By 1902, only two years after the SAA's effective date, coupling accidents constituted only 4% of all employee accidents. Coupler-related accidents dropped from nearly 11,000 in 1892 to just over 2,000 in 1902, even though the number of railroad employees steadily increased during that decade.

When the Janney coupling was chosen to be the American standard, there were 8,000 patented alternatives to choose from. The only significant disadvantage of using the AAR (Janney) design is that sometimes the drawheads need to be manually aligned. 

During the transition period from link-and-pin couplers, knuckle couplers on many locomotives had a horizontal gap and a vertical hole in the knuckle itself to accommodate, respectively, a link and a pin, to enable it to couple to vehicles which were still equipped with the older link-and-pin couplers.

Changes since 1873  

The Janney coupler has withstood the test of time since its invention, with only minor changes:
 The current AAR contour dates back to the 1888 Master Car Builders Association (MCBA) design, which, in turn is based on the 1879 Janney patent. 
 Buckeye coupler, a side-operated version of the MCBA coupler
 Type D coupler, adopted in 1916 by the MCBA (predecessor of ARA), had individual parts interchangeable, simplifying maintenance. Earlier designs had compatible profiles, but component parts differed between manufacturers, creating maintenance problems when cars were interchanged with other railroads.
 Type E coupler, adopted in 1930 by the ARA (predecessor of AAR), also had individual parts interchangeable, though not with Type D due to improvements. Still the most widely used design today. Tank cars carrying hazardous materials are equipped with Type E double shelf couplers.
 Type F coupler, a vertically interlocking variation to prevent accidents, derailments and wrecks from disconnecting the coupler. Type F also includes versions with rotating shafts for hopper car rotary dumpers, such as on the Pilbara railways and Transnet Freight Rail's Sishen-Sandanha Iron Ore and Ermelo-Richards Bay Coal Terminal lines.
 Type H coupler, a "tight-lock" variation to reduce slack action and improve safety for passenger cars. Now under the supervision of the APTA (American Public Transportation Association).
 Improvements in metallurgy and casting techniques to increase maximum trailing load.
 Some narrow-gauge railways such as the Victorian Puffing Billy Railway use a three-quarter- or one-half-scale version of the Janney/MCB coupler.

Bazeley Coupler 
Bazeley Coupler 1905-1918 M.C.B. D Type established as the Universal M.C.B. Standard, Adopted 1915

Arthur James Bazeley (1872-1937), railway couplings inventor/design engineer; was born in Bristol, England, in 1872, and worked for the Great Western Railway until the age of 34 when he immigrated to Cleveland, Ohio, in 1906, where he worked as a mechanical engineer for National Malleable Castings, Co., inventing and designing improvements in the function, strength, and durability of the (MCB/ARA/AAR/APTA) Janney, Knuckle, Alliance couplers and other coupling devices/draw gear for the evolving heavier demands by US railways, as well as,  National Malleable Castings' international customers in the United Kingdom, India, and many other countries building and expanding their railway systems. A.J. Bazeley was directly responsible for over 90 registered U.S. patents for railway automatic coupler improvements through design, under the coupler type names which included the "Buckeye coupler", the "Sharon Coupler" PAT APP Nov. 10, 1910, 1911,1913, 1914, the "Simplex Coupler" PAT APP May 3, 1903, the "Climax Coupler", the "Latrobe Coupler", the "Tower Coupler", the "Major Coupler", the "Gould Coupler", the "Pitt Coupler", the "R.E. Janney Coupler", the "Kelso Coupler" and others.

A.J. Bazeley related railway inventions, U.S. patents and railway coupler mechanical drawings and illustrations filed and assigned to National Malleable Castings Company can be referenced by a patent search under "Bazeley, railway couplings" or "Arthur James Bazeley, railway couplings patents" which have been drawn/filed and provided by Roger Bazeley-USA, MSTM, MSID, CHSRM Mineta Transportation Institute, Transportation Industrial Designer. A.J. Bazeley Railway Coupling, Construction/Design Improvements and Draft Rigging related patents include: US 1193222, US 124622, US 1932719, US 1518299, US 1932503, US 2235194, US 1932440 and others.

National Malleable Castings in 1891 absorbed the Chicago Malleable Iron which was founded in 1873 by Alfred A. Pope and John C. Coonley, who operated similar companies in Ohio and Indiana. By the late 1880s, the company employed nearly 1,000 men at its 26th and Western Chicago works, which manufactured various railroad couplers and steel products for the railroad industries. In 1891, Chicago Malleable became part of the new National Malleable Castings Co., the Cleveland-based company, where Arthur J. Bazeley was employed as a senior design engineer, had additional manufacturing plants across the Midwest. National  Malleable purchased the Latrobe Steel & Coupler's plant in Melrose Park, Illinois, in 1909. In 1923, when it had begun to supply the automobile industry, the company changed its name to National Malleable & Steel Castings. Its stock was listed on the New York Stock Exchange beginning in 1936 

The National Malleable Castings Bazeley Coupler 1905-1918 M.C.B. D Type as Universal M.C.B. Standard Adopted 1915

At a joint M.C.B. Coupler Committee meeting on July 15, 1913, out of numerous studied competing railway coupler manufacturers and designs two couplers were selected for the new proposed universal U.S./Canadian coupler design standard, adopted, June 15, 1916 by the M.C.B. The two couplers accepted were the Malleable Castings Company Bazeley Coupler, and the American Steel Foundries No.3 modified Alliance Coupler, out of nine couplers submitted to the committee as embodying the joint specification of design, The TYPE D coupler design based on The National Malleable Castings Bazeley Coupler patented designs and improvements was selected as the standard M.C.B Association's standard from 1918., after M.C.B. performance tested it along with the Type C designs.
 
The Type “D” Experimental Standard M.C.B. Coupler was unanimously recommended by the Master Car Builders Association and its Coupler Committee for adoption as the National/International (United States/Canadian) standard for coupler design and manufacturing specification uniformity by the M.C.B. Master Car Builders’ Association on June 15, 1916 after its 1915 Convention. This resulted in the sharing of U.S. Patent improvements and agreed to by The National Malleable Castings Company, Henry Pope President; The Buckeye Steel Castings Company, The Gould Coupler Company, American Steel Foundries and The Monarch Steel Castings Company, and to be the active standard M.C.B. D Type forward from January 1, 1918. Buckeye Steel Castings Company was founded in 1881 as the Murray-Hayden Foundry before changing to The Buckeye Automatic Car Coupler Company and in 2002 after filing bankruptcy was reformed as Columbus Castings.

Railway couplers were manufactured in accordance with the Standard Specifications of the AAR covering the purchase and acceptance of couplers, knuckles, locks and other working parts as shown in their "Mechanical Division Manual of Standards and Recommended Practice". Specifications as of March 1939 required that the fabrication casting material be of open hearth or electric furnace grade "B" steel with specific metallurgic requirements to insure proper tensile strength and reliability of the coupler and its moving parts. In order to govern uniform standards for the interchangeability and the proper relation between fitting parts, the A.R.A. Committee on Couplers and draft gears designed and distributed templates, gauges, and master guides to assure the proper interchangeability and fitting of parts to maintain the proper operation of various multi-source manufactured railway couplers.

Gallery

See also 

 Buckeye Steel Castings
 Draft gear
 Drawbar (haulage)
 Dual coupling
 Gangway connection
 Headstock (rolling stock)
 Jane's World Railways, lists the coupler(s) used on any railway system
 Railway coupling
 Railway coupling by country
 SA3 coupler
 Slack action
 South Station (Boston), includes a sculpture built of railroad car couplers
 Three-point hitch
 Tightlock coupling

References

External links
  Trains (magazine)
 Offset or gooseneck couplers
 FREIGHT VEHICLE COUPLERS AND DRAFT GEAR
 Adapter piece between Janney coupler and SA3 coupler
 Patent US1194109 A, 
 Patent US1194110 A  
 Patent 643581 A
 Double shelf coupler

Couplers